Dupaningan Agta (Dupaninan Agta), or Eastern Cagayan Agta, is a language spoken by a semi-nomadic hunter-gatherer Negrito people of Cagayan and Isabela provinces in northern Luzon, Philippines. Its Yaga dialect is only partially intelligible.

Geographic distribution and dialects
Robinson (2008) reports Dupaningan Agta to be spoken by a total of about 1,400 people in about 35 scattered communities, each with 1-70 households.
 Palaui Island - Speakers do not consider themselves to be Dupaningan, but the language is very similar to that of the other Dupaningans.
 Nangaramuan, Santa Ana
 Barongagunay, Santa Clara, Santa Ana
 Valley Cove, Baggao
 Kattot
 Bolos a Ballek (Bolos Point) - village where the Dupaningan Agta language is most widely used
 Bolos a Dakal (Bolos, Maconacon, Isabela)
 Santa Clara, Gonzaga, Cagayan
Ethnologue reports Yaga, Tanglagan, Santa Ana-Gonzaga, Barongagunay, Palaui Island, Camonayan, Valley Cove, Bolos Point, Peñablanca, Roso (Southeast Cagayan), Santa Margarita as dialects of Dupaningan Agta.

Phonology

Consonants

Where symbols appear in pairs, the one to the right is voiced.

Vowels

/a, e/ have lax allophones of [ə, ɛ].

References

External links
 PARADISEC has an open access collection of recordings in Dupaningan Agta. These recordings include elicitation sessions, wordlists, stories, and songs. Sessions also include Ilocano, the local contact language, and occasionally also Tagalog.
, slightly revised from Robinson's 2008 thesis

Aeta languages
Northeastern Luzon languages
Endangered Austronesian languages
Languages of Cagayan
Languages of Isabela (province)